2016–2017 Central Italy earthquakes may refer to:

August 2016 Central Italy earthquake
October 2016 Central Italy earthquakes
January 2017 Central Italy earthquakes